Cheltenham railway station is located on the Outer Harbor line.

History

Cheltenham station opened in 1959. It originally had a ticket office and toilets either side of the current shelter, but they closed in 1986. The facilities were demolished shortly afterwards. In late 2016, the station was ranked as one of the worst stations in the western suburbs based on 5 criteria.

The station shelter and seating was replaced in 2017.

Services by platform

References

External links

Railway stations in Adelaide
Railway stations in Australia opened in 1959